Floyd I. "Bud" Gaugh IV (born October 2, 1967) is an American drummer who played in the bands Sublime (1988–1996), Long Beach Dub Allstars (1997–2002), Eyes Adrift (2002–2003), Volcano (2004), and Sublime with Rome (2009–2011), as well as Phil & the Blanx, Del Mar, and Jelly of the Month Club.

Biography
Gaugh started his drumming career in high school playing snare with the Long Beach Junior Concert Band.

He met bassist Eric Wilson in 1979 and later started their first garage punk band, which was named The Juice Bros. They became founding members of Sublime in 1986. Around 1990, according to Marshall Goodman, Gaugh left the band due to some unknown reasons. Gaugh would not be the primary drummer on the 40 oz. to Freedom record or be a part of the two tours that followed its release in 1992. Gaugh would rejoin the band sometime shortly after for Robbin’ the Hood, which was released in 1994. In 1996, Sublime disbanded due to the death of lead singer Bradley Nowell from a heroin overdose. The Long Beach Dub Allstars then formed in 1997. Their first album, released in 1999, was called Right Back.

Gaugh played drums in the Eyes Adrift with Krist Novoselic and Curt Kirkwood. After Eyes Adrift disbanded, he went on to form Volcano with Kirkwood. Since Eyes Adrift, Gaugh now spends his time at his home in Nevada, snowboarding, skating, skiing and kayaking in Colorado and Lake Tahoe.

It was announced in early 2009 that Gaugh would be reuniting with Sublime at Cantina Los Tres Hombres in 
Sparks, Nevada, on February 28, with new frontman and guitarist Rome Ramirez in the place of Bradley Nowell. Following positive response, the band decided to reunite properly in August 2009 for a possible tour and new album. However, not long after the October 2009 performance at Cypress Hill's Smokeout Festival, a Los Angeles judge banned the new lineup from using the Sublime name, and the band was forced to change its name. The new lineup of Eric Wilson, Bud Gaugh, and Rome Ramirez performed together as Sublime with Rome. A debut album, Yours Truly, was released on July 12, 2011.

Gaugh left Sublime with Rome on December 10, 2011 and was replaced by Josh Freese. On January 12, 2012, in an interview posted on budztv.com, Gaugh expressed regrets about touring and recording with Sublime with Rome, stating, "In hindsight I would not have used the name. I didn't want to in the first place, I was talked into it and I would like to apologize to certain people and the fans for trying to justify or talk them into it as well." When asked how it felt to play Sublime songs again, Gaugh said, "It was really good for the first few months; after that, it just felt wrong. Not playing the songs but playing them with the name Sublime, without Brad."

When asked if he saw the band reuniting in the future Gaugh replied, "No, I am done with SWR. I would be into playing music with Eric Wilson, however."

In 2016, Gaugh appeared on an episode of Finding Bigfoot, where he and long time friend James "Bobo" Fay explore the wilderness in search of the elusive beast.

Discography

Sublime
Jah Won't Pay the Bills (1991)
40oz. to Freedom (1992)
Robbin' the Hood (1994)
Sublime (1996)
Second-hand Smoke (1997)
Stand by Your Van (1998)
Sublime Acoustic: Bradley Nowell & Friends (1998)
Everything Under the Sun: Rarities (2006)

Long Beach Dub All-Stars
Right Back (1999)
Wonders of the World (2001)

Eyes Adrift
Eyes Adrift (2003)

Volcano
Volcano (2004)

Del Mar
 Demo (2007)
 After The Quake (2009)

Sublime with Rome
Yours Truly (2011)

Jelly of the Month Club
Introducing the Jelly of the Month Club (2013)
Enjoy the Show (2018)

References

External links 
 Official site
 Myspace site
 Del Mar article
 

1967 births
Living people
Musicians from Long Beach, California
American punk rock drummers
American male drummers
Sublime (band) members
20th-century American drummers
Eyes Adrift members
Long Beach Dub Allstars members
Volcano (supergroup) members
Sublime with Rome members